Timon C. West (born October 5, 1980) is an American film director, producer, screenwriter, editor, cinematographer, and occasional actor, best known for his work in horror films. He directed the horror films The Roost (2005), The House of the Devil (2009), The Innkeepers (2011), The Sacrament (2013), X and its prequel Pearl (both 2022), and the Western In a Valley of Violence (2016). He has also acted in a number of films, mostly in those directed by either himself or Joe Swanberg.

Early life
West was born in Wilmington, Delaware. His given name Timon was the surname of his maternal grandfather. He was featured in a 2001 fall issue of Teen People magazine. West attended the School of Visual Arts.

Career
West's directorial work includes the 2001 short The Wicked, and feature films The Roost (2005), Trigger Man (2007), The House of the Devil (2009), The Innkeepers (2011), and The Sacrament (2013). He appeared in 2004's The Woman Who Split Before Dinner as Old Man Conrad. In 2009, West wrote, produced and directed the web series Dead & Lonely for IFC Films. The first series run ended in October 2009. West disowned the 2009 horror film Cabin Fever 2: Spring Fever, citing massive interference and re-editing as the reasons. He wanted to remove his name completely from the film and give directing credit to Alan Smithee, but his request was denied.

West was set to direct The Haunting in Georgia, the sequel to The Haunting in Connecticut, but left the project in March 2010. In 2012, he worked with Adam Wingard, Simon Barrett, David Bruckner, Joe Swanberg, Glenn McQuaid and the Radio Silence Productions hosts Matt Bettinelli-Olpin and Chad Villella on the anthology horror film V/H/S. He directed the segment "Second Honeymoon".

In June 2015, it was reported that West would direct an episode of MTV's Scream television series. He directed the penultimate episode of the first season, titled "The Dance". He has also directed an episode of Jason Blum and Eli Roth's We TV horror series South of Hell, titled "Take Life Now". West wrote, directed, produced and edited the Western film In a Valley of Violence, starring Ethan Hawke, Taissa Farmiga, and John Travolta. It premiered at South by Southwest in March 2016.

In late 2020, it was announced that A24 would produce a horror film titled X, which would be directed by West and will star Mia Goth, Scott Mescudi, Jenna Ortega, and Brittany Snow. The film was released on March 18, 2022, to critical acclaim. While X was in production, filming in New Zealand was temporarily halted due to the country's lockdown during the COVID-19 pandemic, leading to West spending the time writing a screenplay to a prequel. The film, Pearl, was filmed back-to-back with X once production started up again. Pearl was released in September 2022 to critical acclaim. West later confirmed he was working on a third instalment in the series, a sequel to X titled MaXXXine.

Filmography

Feature films

Short films

Web series

Acting roles

Television

Awards and nominations

References

External links

 

1980 births
American film producers
American film editors
American male screenwriters
American male film actors
American television directors
Horror film directors
Living people
People from Wilmington, Delaware
School of Visual Arts alumni
Film directors from Delaware
Screenwriters from Delaware
21st-century American screenwriters
21st-century American male writers